The second election to Fife Regional Council was held on 2 May 1978 as part of the wider 1978 Scottish regional elections. The election saw Labour maintaining their control of the region's 42 seat council.

Aggregate results

Ward results

References

Fife
1978
May 1978 events in the United Kingdom